David Winsor Piccini is a Canadian politician who is the Ontario Minister of the Environment, Conservation and Parks since June 18, 2021. He was elected to the Legislative Assembly of Ontario in the 2018 provincial election. He represents the riding of Northumberland—Peterborough South as a member of the Progressive Conservative Party of Ontario.

Piccini is formerly a member of the Standing Committee on Finance and Economic Affairs and served as the Parliamentary Assistant to the Minister of Colleges and Universities, positions he held since his election.

Career 
Piccini formerly worked for the Royal College of Physicians and Surgeons of Canada where he supported their international work. In 2018, Piccini helped found the Canadian International Health Education Association, leading one of Canada’s largest health care missions to the Gulf region.

In 2015, Piccini ran in Ottawa-Vanier for the Conservative Party of Canada but finished third.

Electoral record

References

Progressive Conservative Party of Ontario MPPs
21st-century Canadian politicians
Living people
Canadian people of Italian descent
People from Northumberland County, Ontario
Conservative Party of Canada candidates for the Canadian House of Commons
1988 births